Hind Congress Party is a political party in New Delhi, India. The party launched eleven candidates in the 2007 Akola Municipal Corporation election, out of whom one was elected.

References

Political parties in Maharashtra
Political parties with year of establishment missing